Dave Power is an English-born, American retired professional footballer.

Career
Power was born and Liverpool, and played on the Everton F.C. youth squad. He began his professional career in Ireland with Waterford F.C. In 1975 while the club was touring the U.S., Waterford struck an on-loan deal for his services with New York Apollo during the summer months. After the 1977 season, he decided to move to the U.S. permanently and signed with the Apollo, winning the ASL title in 1978. In 1981 he followed former Apollo's head coach, Rodney Marsh to the Carolina Lightnin' for three seasons and won his second ASL title. In 1984 he again followed Marsh, this time to the Tampa Bay Rowdies of the NASL, but a broken leg in a friendly against Stoke City F.C. abruptly ended his season after making only one league appearance. Power played two indoor seasons in the American Indoor Soccer Association; one for the Columbus Capitals and one back with Marsh and the Rowdies. He remained with Tampa Bay as they transitioned back to outdoors in the ASL/APSL before retiring in 1990.

Power was a three-time ASL all-star and a two-time ASL champion. He served as team captain in New York for two years, at Carolina for three years and with Tampa Bay for four years. At one time he also served as director of the Rowdies' summer camp youth program, Camp Kickinthegrass.

Honors
ASL Champion:
1978
1981
ASL All-Stars: 
1979
1982
1983

References

External links
Dave Power's NASL/AISA/ASL/APSL stats

1954 births
Living people
American Indoor Soccer Association players
American Professional Soccer League players
American Soccer League (1933–1983) players
American Soccer League (1988–89) players
Carolina Lightnin' players
Columbus Capitals players
English expatriate footballers
Expatriate soccer players in the United States
League of Ireland players
New York Apollo players
North American Soccer League (1968–1984) players
Tampa Bay Rowdies (1975–1993) players
Tampa Bay Rowdies executives
Waterford F.C. players
Association football defenders
English expatriate sportspeople in the United States
English footballers